Joji , or stylized as JOJI is a 2021 Indian Malayalam-language crime drama film directed by Dileesh Pothan and written by Syam Pushkaran. The story is inspired by William Shakespeare's play Macbeth. The film was produced by Bhavana Studios in association with Working Class Hero, and Fahadh Faasil and Friends. Fahadh Faasil plays the title character, while Baburaj, Shammi Thilakan, and Unnimaya Prasad play other pivotal roles. The plot revolves around a wealthy family of three sons and a father living in the countryside of Kerala.

Principal photography took place from November 2020 to January 2021, shot extensively in Kottayam. Joji released through the OTT service Amazon Prime Video on 7 April 2021 to wide critical acclaim.

Plot 
  
Joji, an engineering dropout, along with elder brothers Jomon and Jaison lead a life of fear under their dominating father Kuttappan. The family also includes Jaison's wife Bincy and Jomon's teenage son Popy. They live in a vast house in the middle of a sizable plantation in the high ranges of Covid ridden Kerala. While Joji looks meek among his father and brothers, he appears to share a bond with Bincy and Popy.

Despite being 74, Kuttappan is well-built and is very much in charge of family affairs. Jomon, a divorcee, aids him in agriculture in their vast estate, while Jaison manages their businesses in town. Joji is running unsuccessful ventures, the remains of them being a horse tied in their estate. He is financially dependent on Kuttappan who physically abuses Joji. Bincy manages the household chores and is always shown to be occupied in the kitchen. A pond is being dug in the family yard by workers including Gireesh and Sudhi. Kuttappan manages to pull out a heavy valve stuck in the mud as nobody else could handle it, but suffers a stroke in the process and is hospitalised. A close relative of the family, Dr Felix, discusses with his fellow doctors and comes to the conclusion that Kuttappan is paralyzed and there is little hope of improvement in his condition. Things look brighter even for Joji as he manages to sell his horse after showing it off to buyers in the family's yard.

However, Kuttappan returns home, bedridden and unable to speak. Jomon is visibly upset over his father's condition, while the others at various levels hope for Kuttappan's speedy death. Joji even visits his father in bed and mocks his paralyzed hand which was used to abuse him. When Kuttappan shows further physical suffering, Jomon decides to sanction a risky surgery, which is fortunately successful. This brings a recovering Kuttappan back home, albeit in a wheelchair, getting everyone in the house back to their old ways.

As prompted by Bincy, Jaison asks his father for money to buy a new house in the town, but is rejected and ridiculed by Kuttappan. Kuttappan also manages to use a pen to sign a cheque indicating his improved condition. An upset Bincy shares her frustration with Joji. Joji decides to stand up against his father and demands him to step down. However, the old man manages to choke Joji with his able left hand and ridicules him as well. Joji decides to kill Kuttappan and begins to secretly replace Kuttappan's daily medication with similar-looking pills. Bincy witnessed this but conceals the truth as she and Jaison are also secretly wishing for Kuttappan's death. Joji's plan works and Kuttappan dies soon.

Jomon, already an alcoholic, bursts firecrackers at the funeral procession, claiming his father would not have wanted a depressing funeral. This leads the family into a scuffle with the church priest, Fr Kevin. Not long after the funeral, the family meets, presided by Dr Felix to partition the dead man's estate. Jomon objects to the partition saying it will be disrespectful to Kuttappan's spirit. Jomon and Jaison enter into a heated argument. Joji rises to the occasion and proposes a solution agreed by both his brothers impressing everyone.

Meanwhile, rumours begin to spread about Kuttappan's death. Joji has nightmares of his father and tries to destroy the pieces of evidence by burning all medicine strips that were used in the gruesome act. But this leads to a fire near the pond. Jomon notices the sign of fire the next morning. Joji manages to escape and lies to Jomon that he doesn't visit the pond at all. Jomon is upset over rumours that Kuttappan's death and is suspicious that someone in the family is behind it. Jomon wants to confront Thotta Sudhi who was loud about Joji's apathetic walking towards the house as Bincy was crying out when Kuttappan died. Joji joins Jomon in searching for Sudhi in the plantations. They find Sudhi working alone on the plantation making thotta (a crude explosive used in breaking stones). When confronted, he runs away after a heated exchange with the brothers but not before spilling some beans which makes Jomon suspect Joji. Realizing Joji is hiding something, Jomon attacks him, and Joji subdues him using Popy's air gun, after which he throws Sudhi's explosives at him, killing Jomon instantly. Joji provides a statement to the police, thus framing Sudhi for Jomon's death.

Over the next few days, Jaison notices weird changes in Joji's behaviour, including him becoming overtly religious, as Bincy begins to question the possibility of Joji's involvement in Jomon's murder as well. During the autopsy, the police find the pellets from the gun in Jomon's body, and Popy realizes that Joji was the only other person who knew of the gun, which was purchased with money stolen from Kuttappan. The family confronts Joji, who continues to deny these claims. Realizing that he will not get away, Joji tries to blackmail Jaison that unless he stands with Joji, he will be implicated as a co-conspirator in the murders. Realising the true colours of Joji, Jaison refuses this categorically. Bincy confesses to Jaison of knowing about some of Joji's acts. Having no way out, Joji attempts suicide by shooting himself with the air gun at his pterion. He also sends a suicide note to the remaining family members blaming society for all his acts.

In the mid-credits scene, it is shown that Joji survives and awakens in the hospital, paralyzed. When the police officer asks a bedridden Joji to confess to his crimes by blinking his eyes, Joji forcefully does not blink.

Cast

Production 
On 3 October 2020, Fahadh Faasil announced his next collaboration with Dileesh Pothan after Maheshinte Prathikaaram and Thondimuthalum Driksakshiyum. Titled as Joji, the announcement featured a poster which informed that the film will be based on William Shakespeare's play Macbeth, also becoming the third Macbeth-based Indian film after Maqbool and Veeram. The poster also contained details about the crew, which include Shyju Khalid as cinematographer, Justin Varghese as music director and Kiran Das as editor.

Principal photography began on 13 November 2020 and was shot in Cheruvally estate and Erumely. Kottayam, Kerala. Shooting of the film got wrapped up on 14 January 2021, within a duration of two months.

Music

The film score is composed by Justin Varghese.

{{tracklist
| headline = Joji (Original Soundtrack)
| title_width = 100
| title1 = Main Theme
| length1 = 02:35
| title2 = Prophecy
| length2 = 00:45
| title3 = He Is Back
| length3 = 01:59
| title4 = The Lady Macbeth Element
| length4 = 00:34
| title5 = The Hook
| length5 = 04:47
| title6 = Fire
| length6 = 01:29
| title7 = Execution
| length7 = 02:47
| title8 = Desperation
| length8 = 01:04
| title9 = Fear
| length9 = 02:03
| title10 = Reality
| length10 = 01:17
| title11 = Marana Mozhi
| length11 = 02:20
| title12 = Trailer Music
| length12 = 02:05
}}

Release
On 31 March 2021, Amazon Prime Video India released a teaser and trailer on 2 April 2021 announcing that the film will premiere through the streaming platform on 7 April 2021. Joji was selected as the winner for the Best International Feature Film at Swedish International Film Festival, 2021

Reception
Critical response
The film received highly positive reviews from critics.
Anupama Chopra of Film Companion wrote, "Joji is a reworking of Macbeth and while these words might suggest a period setting, Shakespeare’s tragedy has been reimagined in contemporary times, on a sprawling rubber plantation in Kerala. But Joji, the youngest of three brothers, is very much a subject of his father’s kingdom." Rating 4.5 out of 5 stars, Sajin Shrijith of The New Indian Express said "Joji is another brilliant, debate-worthy film about oppressed characters from the enviable imagination of Syam Pushkaran and director Dileesh Pothan. It's the duo's darkest film yet". Richard Brody of The New Yorker gave the film a positive review, noting, "The script, by Syam Pushkaran, is both practical and fiercely expressive," and concludes, writing, "Long before the plot is resolved, Joji offers a sardonic vision of patriarchal tyranny and the pathologies it spawns... [it] declares, with bitter irony, that there’s no end in sight."

The Indian Express rated 3.5 and wrote, "Shakespeare’s grand meshing of crime and punishment in Macbeth has spawned many film and stage versions in many languages around the world. Joji picks up the overarching theme beautifully (both writer and director have incorporated crime and punishment most innovatively in their previous work). The only time the film loses its grip, ever so slightly, is in the way it slides on the guilt which is part-and-parcel of a killing, and rolls towards an ending which feels pat. I wanted to see more of how the ‘damned spot’ would deepen, and how everyone, especially Joji, would experience it: the climactic coda feels a tad hurried." Firstpost rated 3.5 and wrote, "Joji paints an intriguing portrait of the antonym to mourning in this house of intrigue. Like some of the best of Malayalam cinema’s New New Wave, it is a thoughtful, watchful film in which a chain of events unfolds at a natural pace, presenting a wealth of insights into Malayali culture and customs along the way. The succession-related concerns in the Panachel home, gossip by those claiming to support them, the local church’s influence in their lives, the tense relationship between the parish priest (Basil Joseph) and this moneyed family all add up to a delightful black comedy that perhaps only Dileesh Pothan and writer Syam Pushkaran could have made." 
 
The Times of India rated 3 and wrote, "And this is not a reflection on Dileesh Pothan’s able direction, or the acting talent. Baburaj plays his part with neat restraint, whether he is drunk, comic, angry or confused, and Sunny PN conveys menace perfectly. The camera by Shyju Khalid captures the mood and is immersive, while Justin Varghese’s bgm is quirky and sets the perfect tone. Ultimately, it’s an exaggerated story about the darkness in a man’s heart. But it will definitely be a movie that will be a part of popular culture for its characters." Sify rated 4 and wrote, "Joji is the kind of movie that shakes you up and refuses to leave you long after the end titles start rolling. It is affecting and makes you feel how easy it is for a human to give in to greed and then, face the consequences. This one is a MUST WATCH!" . The Hindu wrote, "Joji is as much a perceptive study of the slow unravelling of a criminal mind, as it is an indictment of the society and the family structure that is the origin point of that criminality. Dileesh Pothan has scored a hat-trick, with three films that are unlike each other"

Critics have also pointed out striking similarities with the 1985 Malayalam film Irakal''.

Accolades

References

External links 
 

2021 films
Indian crime thriller films
2021 crime thriller films
2020s Malayalam-language films
2021 direct-to-video films
Direct-to-video thriller films
Amazon Prime Video original films
Films directed by Dileesh Pothan
 Films scored by Justin Varghese
Films based on Macbeth
Films based on works by William Shakespeare
Patricide in fiction
Fratricide in fiction